The Foster Report is a 1971 report titled Enquiry into the Practice and Effects of Scientology, written by Sir John Foster for the government of the United Kingdom, regarding the Church of Scientology. The report made its case with L. Ron Hubbard's own words and reprinted a number of internal Ethics Orders. It concluded that it would be unfair to ban Scientology outright, but asked for legislation to ensure that psychotherapy in the United Kingdom is delivered in an ethical manner. He regarded the Scientology version of "ethics" as inappropriate.

Documents seized by the FBI in raids on the Church's US headquarters in July 1977 revealed that an agent had been sent to investigate Sir John Foster in an attempt to link him to Paulette Cooper, author of The Scandal of Scientology and victim of Operation Freakout. The documents showed that Lord Balniel, who had requested the official inquiry, was also a target. Hubbard had written, "get a detective on that lord's past to unearth the tit-bits".

Several official inquiries were made into Scientology in England, Australia, and elsewhere, and a number of reports were published by respective governments in the late sixties and early seventies.

See also
 Scientology in the United Kingdom
 Anderson Report - an analogous Australian report
 Dumbleton-Powles Report - an analogous report from New Zealand
Believe What You Like: What happened between the Scientologists and the National Association for Mental Health
Kenneth Robinson

Further reading
The Lee Report, Ontario, Canada, 1970, Sectarian Healers and Hypnotherapy

References

External links
The Foster Report
Official Papers on Scientology
"The Anderson Report"
"The Dumbleton-Powles Report"
"The Lee Report"

Scientology-related controversies
Works critical of Scientology
Scientology in the United Kingdom
1971 in British politics